"The Goose Girl"  is a German fairy tale collected by the Brothers Grimm and first published in Grimm's Fairy Tales in 1815 (KHM 89). It is of Aarne-Thompson type 533.

The story was first translated into English by Edgar Taylor in 1826, then by many others, e.g. by an anonymous community of translators in 1865, by Lucy Crane in 1881, by LucMargaret Hunt in 1884, etc. Andrew Lang included it in The Blue Fairy Book in 1889.

Origin 
The tale was first published by the Brothers Grimm in the first edition of Kinder- und Hausmärchen, vol. 2, in 1815, as number 3. It appears as no. 89 since the second edition (1819). Grimm's source for the story is the German storyteller Dorothea Viehmann (1755–1815).

Summary
A widowed queen sends her daughter to a faraway land to marry.  Accompanying the princess are her magical horse Falada, who can speak, and a waiting maid. The queen gives the princess a special charm that will protect her as long as she wears it.

The princess and her servant travel for a time, and eventually the princess grows thirsty. She asks the maid to go and fetch her some water, but the maid simply says: "If you want water, get it for yourself. I do not want to be your servant any longer." So the princess has to fetch herself water from the nearby stream. She wails softly: "What will become of me?" The charm answers: "Alas, alas, if your mother knew, her loving heart would break in two." After a while, the princess gets thirsty again. So she asks her maid once more to get her some water. But again the evil servant says, "I will not serve you any longer, no matter what you or your mother say." The servant leaves the poor princess to drink from the river by her dainty little hands. When she bends to the water her charm falls out of her bosom and floats away.

The maid takes advantage of the princess's vulnerability. She orders the princess to change clothes with her and the horses as well. She threatens to kill the princess if she doesn't swear never to say a word about this reversal of roles to any living being. Sadly, the princess takes the oath. The maid servant then rides off on Falada, while the princess has to mount the maid's nag. At the palace, the maid poses as princess and the "princess servant" is ordered to guard the geese with a little boy called Conrad. The false bride orders Falada to be killed, as she fears he might talk. The real princess hears of this and begs the slaughterer to nail Falada's head above the doorway where she passes with her geese every morning.

The next morning the goose girl addresses Falada's head over the doorway: "Falada, Falada, thou art dead, and all the joy in my life has fled", and Falada answers " Alas, Alas, if your mother knew, her loving heart would break in two." On the goose meadow, Conrad watches the princess comb her beautiful hair and he becomes greedy to pluck one or two of her golden locks. But the goose girl sees this and says a charm: "Blow wind, blow, I say, take Conrad's hat away. Do not let him come back today until my hair is combed today." And so the wind takes his hat away, and he cannot return before the goose girl has finished brushing and plaiting her hair.

Meanwhile, Conrad goes to the king and declares he will not herd geese with this girl any longer because of the strange things that happen. The king tells him to do it one more time, and the next morning hides and watches. He finds everything as Conrad has told. That evening, he asks the princess to tell him her story. But she refuses to say anything because of her oath. The king suggests that she might tell everything to the iron stove. She agrees, climbs into the stove and tells her story while the king listens from outside.

As the king is convinced she has told the truth, he has the goose girl clad in royal clothes. He then tricks the false princess into "choosing her own punishment". While each choice is different in each version of the story, in the classic version, she tells the king that a false servant should be dragged through town naked in a barrel with internal spikes. As a result, she is punished that way until she dies.

After that, the prince and the true princess are married and reign over their kingdom for many years.

Variants
The story uses the false bride plot with a good-hearted princess being seized by her maid and turned into a common goose girl. It is similar to other AT-533 tales like the American "The Golden Bracelet".  These motifs are also found, centered on a male character, in The Lord of Lorn and the False Steward (Child ballad 271) and the chivalric romance Roswall and Lillian.

In the 13th century, the tale became attached to Bertrada of Laon, the mother of Charlemagne.

Adaptations
Despite the story being viewed as obscure, there have been many film versions, from countries ranging from Germany to even America. Falada is often restored to life in film versions, or even spared entirely. While the Queen is implied to have died in the original story, many versions also have her survive to expose the false bride at the wedding. The false bride's motive for suggesting such a cruel punishment varies by retelling; in some, she is simply too ignorant to recognize herself, others have her play along to keep the charade, and others imply she has believed the king is talking about the true bride. Such film versions include:
 Harold MacGrath adapted the story into a novel, which was then developed into a 1915 American silent film starring Marguerite Clark. In this version, the princess is stolen at birth and raised as a goose-girl, by a courtier who places his own daughter in her stead. The king she was engaged to at birth falls in love with her without knowing who she is. The courtier's daughter, Hildegarde, is ignorant of the truth and portrayed sympathetically in the original novel, but the film version restores her role as a villainess, where she is raised by her father and is only presented as the princess when she has come of age. The film is believed to be lost.
 The plot was reworked into 2002's The Princess and the Pea, combining it with another fairy tale.
 The fairy tale was shown in the 1960s television show Jackanory during Season 1, Episode 38 and was read by Dilys Hamlett.
 In 1985, Tom Davenport adapted the story into a short film as one of his "From the Brothers Grimm" series. While visibly set in the American Appalachia, the narration refers to the characters as princesses, princes, and kings, implying that the story retained its European setting. This version is more faithful to Grimm, as Falada is not restored and the false bride is put to death.
 Titled "The Goose Maiden" in this version, the tale was loosely adapted into a 1999 German short animated episode with slight differences from the source material. This episode was a part of the series SimsalaGrimm. While Falada is still beheaded, this version has him restored to life. There is no prince, but the king himself is the betrothed. Another change is that the princess has been bewitched into forgetting who she is, rather than being forced into posing as the goose-girl.

Literature:
 The Goose Girl by Shannon Hale is an adaptation of the tale in the form of a novel.
 Bloodleaf, the first of a young adult fantasy trilogy by Crystal Smith, is a gothic retelling of "The Goose Girl." It was published by HMHTeen in 2019.
 "The Goose Girl" was one of the many folktales used in  Emma Donoghue's novel Kissing The Witch. The tale was titled "The Tale of The Handkerchief".
 Author Alethea Kontis adapted this tale together with The Wild Swans in the form of a novel titled Dearest.
 Adrienne Rich's 1974 poem "The Fact of a Doorframe" references the Goose Girl.
 The tale was retold into a short children's book by Eric A. Kimmel.
 In the shōjo manga Ludwig Revolution (ルードヴィッヒ革命 Rūdovihhi Kakumei) the story tells about Prince Ludwig who is ordered by his father to find himself a wife more suitable than the women he often brings into the castle. Along with his servant Wilhelm, they travel across the land in search of fair maidens from classic stories in hopes of finding Ludwig a wife. It includes the tale of "The Goose Girl" among other tales from the Brothers Grimm.
 "Falada: the Goose Girl's Horse" is a short story adaption by author Nancy Farmer. This version tells the classic tale from Falada's point of view.
 The Canadian poet Jay Macpherson references the story of the Goose Girl in her poems "Poor Child" and "What Falada Said," both reprinted in Poems Twice Told: The Boatman and Welcoming Disaster.  
 The Scottish comic book writer Grant Morrison references the story in Doom Patrol issue 31, "The Word Made Flesh," when Baphomet takes the form of Falada's head.
 Intisar Khanani, author of the Sunbolt Chronicles, wrote a fantasy retelling of the Goose Girl, titled "Thorn". The novel was independently published in 2012 and re-published by HarperCollins in 2020. 
 "Feathers of Snow: A Goose Girl Retelling" by Alice Ivinya is a book based on the fairy tale.
 Though Eudora Welty's novella The Robber Bridegroom is named after and largely follows the plot of a different Brothers Grimm fairy tale, much of the action derives from "The Goose Girl."
 "Little Thieves" by Margeret Owen is a YA fantasy novel retelling the story of the Goose Girl from the perspective of the princess' maid. It was published in 2021 by Henry Holt and Co.

Other:
  Although an original story, the German opera Königskinder by Engelbert Humperdinck was inspired by Brothers Grimm fairy tales, particularly "The Goose Girl."  
 In the Doom Patrol comics and live-action series, Baphomet, a magical oracle able to appear in any guise she chooses, in the Unwritten Book storyline, chose to appear in the guise of Falada the magic horse, from The Goose Girl.

References

External links

 
The Goose Girl

Grimms' Fairy Tales
Female characters in fairy tales
Fictional princesses
Fictional servants
European fairy tales
European folklore characters
Horses in culture
ATU 500-559
False hero